Johannes Echarius Carolus or Jean Eugène Charles Alberti (bapt. 20 June 1777 - after 1843), was a Dutch painter of Italian descent who worked in Paris for most of his life.

Life
Alberti was born in Maastricht.  He studied first in Amsterdam, where he had moved at the age of five, and then at Paris under David, and afterwards in Rome, where he copied the works of Guido Reni and Anthony van Dyck. He subsequently returned and settled in Paris. He left Paris in 1843, presumably returning to the Netherlands, but the date of his death is not recorded. Marius among the Ruins of Carthage, painted in 1805, gained him a gold medal.

Alberti made engravings both from his own works and from those of the Italian masters.

References
 
Alberti, Jean Eugène Charles  at the RKD databases

1777 births
1840s deaths
Dutch painters
Dutch male painters
Artists from Maastricht
Pupils of Jacques-Louis David
Prix de Rome (Netherlands) winners
18th-century Dutch people
19th-century Dutch people